Oki Doki Doc (also known as Oki Doki Dok) was a Philippine sitcom which aired on ABS-CBN from October 23, 1993 to December 2, 2000, and was replaced by Arriba, Arriba!. It originally aired every Saturday nights, then transferred to Wednesday nights, and later transferred back to Saturday nights again. This show is referenced in the new ABS-CBN sitcom That's My Doc.

This series is currently streaming on Jeepney TV YouTube channel  everyday at 9:00 p.m.

Synopsis
This sitcom revolves around the adventures and misadventures in the life of Dr. Aga, a young veterinarian who has inherited his brother's children. Dr. Aga has just opened his animal clinic in a middle-class subdivision and plans on a successful career. He lives with his best friend and "kinakapatid" Godo in the duplex that is in a compound owned by Don Berto Makunatan a.k.a. Babsy. His duplex unit doubles up as his vet office while the other unit is used by Babsy and his three children, Paolo, Alex (Agot Isidro) and Toni (Claudine Barretto).

Aga was leading a normal single life and was quite enjoying his bachelorhood when his brother-in-law lost his job. Because of this unfortunate situation, his brother-in-law is forced to take on a job abroad which required him to bring his wife. Being the only relative who has a respectable status, Aga is stuck with the responsibility of caring for his sister's two children, Camille (Camille Prats) and Fonzie (Alfonso Martinez). This cuts short his life as a bachelor and catapults him into the status of a father and mother.

Few years later, Aga and his friends decides to leaving from their former home due to the demolition to make way for the construction of a flyover. However, they are transfer to their new territory near the street market. In their new community, they are joined by their new neighbors, friends and acquaintances including Alfredo (Ching Arellano) and Dyords (Carmina Villaroel).

Cast

Main cast
 Aga Muhlach as Dr. Agaton "Doc Aga" Villaluz is the typical "guy next door" kind of fellow. Women fall for him easily because of his boyish looks. He is what viewers perceive as truly "Pinoy." He is very practical in his approach to life and fervently hopes of finding the girl of his dreams and finally settling down. He is very well organized and clean. He loves having fun and once in a while plays jokes on friends. He has a well-balanced sense of humor and enjoys displaying this. Aga is very reliable and believes that a man's word is sacred. Aside from being a veterinarian, he loves to dance and engage in sports. He adores his "pamangkins" and takes very good care of them. He simply loves animals and this is why he's able to put up with his "kinakapatid", Godo.
 Babalu (1993–1998) as Don Robert Makunatan, Popsy or Mang Berto is a millionaire don, rich but kuripot, since the death of his wife, Mamsy. He is a balut magnate, so to speak, but is a very shrewd and cunning businessman. In spite of his stinginess in business, he usually softens up once his daughters, Toni and Alex, makes endearments to him. He also has a son, Paolo, whom he expects to follow and take over his  balut business. Popsy has an inherent hatred over Godo and dislikes Aga for his daughter Alex. 
 Agot Isidro as Alex: the best girlfriend that Aga has. She is a flight attendant. She perceives herself as one of the boys but, as far as Aga is concerned, he has a secret crush on her, which eventually leads to a more serious relationship. She loves to travel and talk about her travels. She dreams of becoming a top executive in the airline company.

Supporting cast
 Carmina Villaroel as Dyords/George is one of the newest (1995) addition to the "family". George is the bigger version of Camille. She is the street-smart vendor who sells second hand clothes on the market. Being left alone by her parents to fend for herself, she has grown tougher and more independent. She looks at life one day at a time and is very practical about treating and looking at life's situations. George lives in the attic room where Aga and Godo lives. This set-up doesn't bother her since she considers Aga and Godo her brothers. 
 Claudine Barretto as Toni Makunatan (regular 1993–1998, recurring 1999–2000) is our typical teenager of the 1990s. She is going through the most difficult stage of her life — puberty. She likes other boys and leads a normal life. She can sometimes be scheming, especially when there's something she really wants. She has a bright outlook at life and this can be seen in her aggressiveness. Her role model when it comes to womanhood is her sister, Alex. 
 Camille Prats as Camille — She is our typical "siga" little girl who is fond of doing boyish stuff and games. She loves kicking Godo in the shin and this makes him jump up and down She has tomboyish tendencies which Aga and Alex discourage. the thing with her is that only Godo catches her when she causes trouble but she takes on the persona of an angel when Aga or Alex arrive, therefore putting the blame on Godo. 
 Rica Peralejo as Rica, Aga's cousin.
 Alfonso Martinez as Fonzie 
 Paolo Contis as Paolo is the only son of Babsy. He is a regular "pilyo" and enjoys playing pranks on people. When he grows up, he intends to follow his father's footsteps by being a successful balut magnate. He idolizes his father to the point that he emulates his weird sense of fashion. he seems a lot smarter than Godo and makes Godo do all sorts of things for him. He also idolizes Aga.
 Charlene Gonzales (1999–2000)
 Katya Santos as Katya (1993-1995), Doc Aga's niece.
 Jimmy Santos as Godo: The complete opposite of Aga. He is a slob, a hustler, and a wanton. He was once Aga's classmate in Vet Med but Aga continued on to become a full-fledged Vet, while Godo stayed on in his first year. a professional student by practice, his parents believed that he is now in his last few semester of Medicine Proper. Always out for an extra buck, he constantly invites conflict and trouble into their lives. He acts as Aga's assistant in the clinic and does most of the clean-up jobs. He pictures himself as God's gift to women, but seems to attract the homely types. He is in constant conflict with the land owner Babsy.
 Ching Arellano as SPO2 Alfredo Rin; SPO, as people fondly call him, is the guardian of the market. He sees to it that there is order in the community and he tries his very best to serve his constituents, and his very own small way. SPO is a dedicated police man. He does not engage in shadowy deals and never accepted a single bribe in his whole life. Because of his good-naturedness and being very accommodating, there are times when people take advantage of this. This leads him into very uncompromising situations, but, with the help of Aga and company, everything turns out for the best.
 Serena Dalrymple as Pie
 Pia Serrano as Bettina
 Farrah Florer as Krina

Recurring cast
 Roderick Paulate as Dickson
 Don Pepot† (1998–2000) as Mang Berto's older brother who possess the same qualities as his late brother. He replaced the character Don Robert Makunatan after Babalu's death in 1998.
 Benjie Paras 
 Carmi Martin as Lyn 
 Antoinette Taus (1994-1995) as Antoinette and Fonzie's elder sister.
 Joy Viado† 
 Roselle Nava as Toni's best friend
 Chin Chin Gutierrez as Marinella, she is Babsy's niece.
 Gretchen Barretto as Greterella, she is the sister of Marinella, Babsy's niece.
 Randy Santiago as Rabbit Owner
 Melisa Henderson (2000)
 Martin Nieto as Tintoy, ex-boyfriend of Dickson

Claudine Barretto's departure
Claudine Barretto left Oki Doki Doc during the later years due to her busy schedules in soap operas and films. She was too exhausted with the tight schedule of taping hours when she decided to leave. In 1999, she became a recurring guest star. But due to her soap opera commitments she later on decided to leave the show totally. She was then replaced by Rica Peralejo.

Film

See also
That's My Doc
List of programs broadcast by ABS-CBN
Jeepney TV

References

External links

1993 Philippine television series debuts
1996 films
2000 Philippine television series endings
1990s Philippine television series
ABS-CBN original programming
Filipino-language television shows
Philippine television sitcoms
Star Cinema films